Damqatum is an annual academic journal published by the Center of Studies of Ancient Near Eastern History (CEHAO) (Pontifical Catholic University of Argentina, Buenos Aires).  dedicated to the history  and archaeology of the Near East, from the Palaeolithic  to the Ottoman  period. The journal publishes articles for the general public, interviews with prominent researchers as well as news about academic activities.

Published under an initiative of the Pontifical Catholic University of Argentina that promotes unrestricted access to scientific information, Damqatum is freely accessible online. The journal’s articles are characterized by the presentation of preliminary high-impact research results and the use of high-definition images.

Abstracting and indexing
The journal is abstracted and indexed in many bibliographic databases, including AWOL, ETANA, LACRIEE, LatinREV, Red BUCOC, and RODNA.

Editors-in-Chief
The following persons are or have been editors-in-chief:
 Juan Manuel Tebes (2006-2010)
 Francisco Céntola (2011-2015)
 Jorge Cano Moreno (since 2016)

See also
Ancient Near East Monographs
Antiguo Oriente
List of history journals
List of theology journals

References

External links 

Academic journals published by universities of Argentina
Ancient Near East journals
Archaeology journals
Egyptology journals
Multilingual journals
English-language journals
French-language journals
Spanish-language journals
Publications established in 2006
Annual journals